Indian hip hop is a genre of popular music developed in India. Desi hip hop is a term for music and culture which combines the influences of hip hop and the Indian subcontinent; the term desi referring to the South Asian diaspora. The term has also come to be used as an alternative for rap music and even pop music which involves rappers of South Asian origins.

Overview 
Apache Indian, UK artist of Indian origin, was the earliest to make an impact on the UK charts with a series of hits during the 90s.

Baba Sehgal introduced Hindi rap in the nineties with his albums. In 1992, his album Thanda Thanda Pani sold 100,000 copies in three and a half months and brought rap music to the Indian club scene. In the 2000s the Hip hop scene remained limited largely to the underground, with a very niche loyal audience. Hip-hop culture, including graffiti and b-boying started seeping into the club scene and street culture of big cities like Delhi and Mumbai. 
 
Ashok Kumar’s recitation of Harindranath Chattopadhyay’s poem Rail Gaadi is considered to be one of the first rap songs in Bollywood. It was featured in the film Aashirwad (1968). In the 1990s rap started getting popular following the success of Baba Sehgal’s album Thanda Thanda Paani.

One of the early moments of Indian hip hop was the Bengali-language underground film Gandu which narrated a story of a rapper and had a soundtrack which mixed rap with alternative rock. Besides Bollywood and commercial rap music, the underground hip-hop scene started shaping. Many emerging rappers, crews started to create a buzz in the underground hip-hop scene. Artists such as Roll Rida, Noel Sean & groups such as Machas With Attitude, Hiphop Tamizha and Street Academics pioneered respective vernacular rap music scenes.

There was increased interest in the rap genre in India after 2011, with many rappers emerging from across the country. This is largely credited to the success of Yo Yo Honey Singh in India and Bollywood, India's Hindi film industry. Following huge success of his album International Villager, Singh went on to release several hits songs both in independently and in Bollywood. In the wake of success of Honey Singh, a new trend was formed in Bollywood with many producers roping in rap artists for their songs. Bollywood actors like Ranveer Singh, Akshay Kumar and have also tried their hands at rapping.

Indian hip hop has become increasingly popular in India's biggest cities with big names like 'KR$NA' who has been picked up by talent management agencies like OML who now have music videos with millions of views on YouTube.

Director Zoya Akhtar was very impressed and fascinated after listening to "Aafat!” and “Mere Gully Mein”. She wanted to portray the stories of both these young rappers and consequently approached DIVINE & Naezy. Akhtar pitched the idea of making a Bollywood movie based on their lives. Both DIVINE and Naezy agreed.

Due to the exposure through Bollywood, rap became a household term and an increased production of rap music was observed, especially in the Punjabi music industry. There is an ongoing debate among the hip-hop community about the contribution of Honey Singh to the genre. While some artists including Badshah, Ikka, Manj Musik and Bohemia have acknowledged his contribution to the industry, others such as Raftaar and Imran Khan have openly denied it. There is also a negative sentiment among some followers of hip-hop culture in India regarding the recent commercialization of the genre. However, this commercialisation has also led to expansion of the underground scene, with independent artists building a name in Indian hip hop. Because of this, the future of hip-hop in India is generally perceived to be positive. There are many rappers in India, rapping in different languages such as Hindi, Punjabi, Marathi, Kannada, Malayalam, Tamil, Telugu, Bengali, Odia, Bhojpuri, Khasi etc.

Telugu hip hop became notable since the early 2000s when artists such as Smita started hip hop culture in the Telugu language. "Hai Rabba" and "Masaka Masaka" are her best selling albums which received wide acclaim, especially in the Indian sub-continent. Artists such as Raja Kumari, Roll Rida, Noel Sean and Manisha Eerabathini started the trend in the new-age Telugu hip hop by including rap. With the rise of its popularity, these artists started working in Tollywood since the late 2010s.

Tamil hip hop is gaining popularity in India. Many other languages like Kannada and Marathi are also becoming popular among the masses in India.

Protest hip hop 
YoungProzpekt (now KR$NA) released "Kaisa Mera Desh" in 2010. The track was an anti-corruption anthem against the 2010 Commonwealth Games, and the statement of Indian development in particular. It earned a #2 ranking as one of the most watched music videos in India overnight following its release.

Protest hip hop came into limelight again after mass protest started all over India against the Citizenship Amendment Act of 2019. Since the crackdown in JMI, AMU and JNU, and the 2020 Delhi riots several rappers from all over the country have joined the cause with their own sonic protest. Rappers such as Rapper Shaz gained recognition for their protest songs alongside Santhanam Srinivasan Iyer (known as EPR).

Dalit Hip-Hop 
Dalit rap, also called Ambedkarite rap, is a genre of rap in which people belonging to Dalit community show the sufferings and daily discrimination they face due to India's caste system. It commemorates crucial events in Dalit history, paying tribute to anti-caste personalities, it addresses social stereotypes while also demanding equality and respect. Dalit Rappers like Ginni Mahi use rap to commemorate Dalit figures like B. R. Ambedkar while on other hand, rappers like Sumeet Samos use to challenge institutional castiesm and see rap as extension of his activism. The Casteless Collective ,a Tamil Nadu 19-members band, sees itself as a political awareness outfit talking about dalit issues, issues like beef-eating as well as feminism.

References

Indian hip hop
Indian music